The Jewish Americans was a three-part miniseries that originally aired on PBS during the month of January 2008.  It was written and directed by David Grubin.

The series focused on the traditions and styles of American Jews, as well as their contribution to American culture and subsequent impact on American society at large.

The series was narrated by Liev Schreiber, and featured many well-known American Jews, including Louis D. Brandeis, Ruth Bader Ginsburg, Henry Morgenthau, Hank Greenberg, Betty Friedan, Molly Goldberg, Carl Reiner, Sid Caesar, and Tony Kushner.

Executive Produced by Jay Sanderson, JTN Productions

External links
Official website

Interview with David Grubin on "The Jewish Americans" by ReadTheSpirit.com

2000s American television miniseries
Television series about Jews and Judaism
PBS original programming
Films directed by David Grubin
Jews and Judaism in the United States